The 1972 Road Atlanta Can-Am race was the second round of the 1972 Can-Am season.  It was held July 9, 1972, at Road Atlanta in Braselton, Georgia.  It was the third Can-Am race held at the track.

Results
Pole position: Denny Hulme, 1:14.134
Fastest lap: Peter Revson, 1:16.281
Race distance: 
Winner's average speed:

External links
Race results from World Sports Racing Prototypes
Race results from Ultimate Racing History

Road Atlanta
Road Atlanta Can-Am
Road Atlanta